Jeremy Ray Meeks (born February 7, 1984) is an American fashion model. A former member of the Crips street gang, Meeks was arrested in 2014 during a gang sweep called Operation Ceasefire in Stockton, California, after which police posted his mugshot on Facebook, which went viral due to his appearance. He was convicted on federal charges of being a felon in possession of a firearm and grand theft. Meeks' mugshot was noticed by modeling agencies and, upon his release from Mendota Federal Correctional Institution in March 2016, he began a modeling career.

Biography

Early life
Meeks was born on February 7, 1984, and is the son of Katherine Angier and Emery Meeks.

In 2002, Meeks was charged with robbery and corporal injury to a child, assaulting a 16-year-old boy when he was 18. He was sentenced to serve two years in a California prison, during which he admitted to claiming the North Side Gangster Crips.

2014 arrest and viral popularity
In June 18, 2014, Stockton Police Department arrested Meeks and three other men in a multi-agency law enforcement mission dubbed Operation Ceasefire. Meeks was listed as a "convicted felon, arrested for felony weapon charges". He denied the charges. The same day, Meeks' and the other men's mugshots were posted on the Stockton Police Department's Facebook page. Within 24 hours from when the photos were posted to the department's page, Meeks' photo had acquired more than 15,000 "likes" and 3,700 comments, mostly from women enamored with his looks. The next day, on June 19, news and entertainment site BuzzFeed recognized Meeks' mugshot as a "meme". On Friday, June 20, Twitter fans created the hashtag "#feloncrushfriday" in honor of Meeks' mugshot. Stockton Police Department spokesman Joe Silva acknowledged that the mugshot had received more attention than any other mugshot since they launched the Facebook page in 2012. As of April 2021, the post has received 95,000 "likes", 24,000 comments, and 11,000 shares.

A July 2014 court hearing was set, while Meeks awaited his trial at the San Joaquin County Jail, with his bail set at $1,050,000. Meeks' mother, Katherine Angier, set up a GoFundMe page in an attempt to raise money for his bail. His sister, Leanna Rominger, used the proceeds from the campaign to hire a defense lawyer for him. 

On July 3, 2014, a Northern California Grand Jury indicted Meeks on a charge of possession of a semiautomatic .45 caliber pistol that was transported across state borders in the commission of Grand Theft. The state dropped its charges against Meeks and his case was handed over to federal prosecutors.

On February 5, 2015, Meeks was convicted by a federal judge of one count of being a felon in possession of a firearm, and was sentenced to 27 months in federal prison. The judge further ordered Meeks to participate in the 500-Hour Bureau of Prisons Substance Abuse Treatment Program. He was incarcerated at Mendota Federal Correctional Institution. Meeks served 13 months of the sentence, and was released from prison March 8, 2016, after which he was ordered to reside in a transitional housing facility for a few weeks.

Modeling career
On March 4, 2015, photographer and talent agent Jim Jordan's company White Cross Management confirmed having signed a management contract with Meeks. Jordan began working with Meeks upon the latter's release from the transitional housing facility which he was ordered to stay in after his March 2016 release from prison. Meeks' first modeling headshot was published in June 2016.  White Cross Management continues to manage Meeks, and featured Meeks on the cover of their online magazines James Magazine USA Vol. VII and White Cross Magazine Vol. 01. 

On February 13, 2017, Meeks made his runway debut for the Philipp Plein Fall/Winter 2017/2018 Women's And Men's Fashion Show collection at the New York Public Library during New York Fashion Week. In April, Meeks was scheduled for an appearance and series of photo shoots in the United Kingdom, but was barred from entering the country upon landing in Heathrow Airport. Meeks was interrogated by officials and then sent back to the United States. Meeks made his European runway debut in May 2017 at Philipp Plein’s resort 2018 presentation at the 2017 Cannes Film Festival. He then walked for Plein’s spring/summer 2018 sport collection on June 18 during Milan Fashion Week.

In August 2017, Meeks appeared in a campaign for Israeli sunglasses fashion house Carolina Lemke, partially owned by Israeli model Bar Refaeli. The campaign tagged Meeks' background as different from Refaeli's, who appeared in the campaign alongside Meeks, stating, "There has never been a mix like this". In December, Meeks appeared on the cover of the men's fashion magazine MMScene.

Meeks appeared in Tommy Hilfiger's Spring 2018 fashion show in Milan on February 25 of the same year. The show was a collaboration with model Gigi Hadid and ran during Milan Fashion Week. He appeared on the cover of the Summer 2018 issues of the fashion and lifestyle magazines FV and L' Officiel Hommes.

In September 2019, Frankfurt-based fashion company Fashion Concept GmbH announced a $15 million partnership with Meeks to build a fashion line in his name. The fashion line launched in July 2020. 

In November 2019, Meeks became brand ambassador for fragrance line Gisada Switzerland's fragrance duo "Gisada Ambassador."

Acting career
In January 2018, Meeks flew to Moscow to appear in the music video "Wi-Fi" by Russian pop singer Olga Buzova.

Meeks made his feature film debut in 2020 with the BET+ streaming feature Trigger. In 2021, Meeks appeared in the independent feature film Secret Society; the film was directed by Jamal Hill, and is based on the book of the same name by Miasha Coleman.

Personal life
Meeks has a child with Melissa Meeks, to whom he was married from 2008 to 2018.

In June 2017, it was reported that Meeks was in a relationship with Chloe Green, the daughter of British businessman Philip Green. Meeks had gone on a trip to Turkey, where the first images of him and Green came out on a yacht. On May 29, 2018, Green gave birth to the couple's son. In August 2019, it was reported the couple had amicably split and were selling their joint London home.

References

External links

1984 births
American people convicted of theft
Criminals from California
Crips
Living people
Male models from California